Dead Serious may refer to:

 Dead Serious (organization), an organization in Fort Worth, Texas which offers $5,000 to any member that kills a criminal in self-defense
 Dead Serious (album), an album by Das EFX
 Dead Serious (EP), an EP by Hullabaloo